Henri Edward Jeanneret (1 January 1878 – 1 June 1935) was a Swiss-born Australian rules footballer who played in the Victorian Football League (VFL).

Playing career
A wingman, Jeanneret made his debut for South Melbourne in Round 1 of the 1898 VFL season. After 75 matches for South Melbourne over six seasons, he moved to Melbourne for the 1904 VFL season. At Melbourne he played four matches.

Notes

References
 South Melbourne Team, Melbourne Punch, (Thursday, 4 June 1903), p.16.

External links

 
 
 Henri Jeanneret at Demonwiki.

1878 births
VFL/AFL players born outside Australia
Melbourne Football Club players
Sydney Swans players
Swiss emigrants to Australia
Swiss players of Australian rules football
1935 deaths